Edurne Ganem, known professionally as  Edy Ganem,  is an American actress, known for her role as Valentina Diaz in the Lifetime comedy-drama series Devious Maids.

Life and career
Ganem was born in Modesto, California and raised in Torreón, Coahuila, Mexico along with her two younger brothers. Her parents are both of Mexican and Lebanese descent, Ghanem being Arabic (غانم) for "victorious". She is a graduate of the University of San Diego.  In 2008, she had various small roles in three episodes of HBO's comedy-drama series Entourage. Ganem had guest roles on several television shows, including It's Always Sunny in Philadelphia, CSI: Crime Scene Investigation, The Cleveland Show and Rob.

On Lifetime's Devious Maids, Ganem played Valentina Diaz, the positive, open-minded nineteen-year-old daughter and co-worker of Zoila Diaz (Judy Reyes) and love interest of Genevieve Delatour's (Susan Lucci's) son, Remi Delatour (Drew Van Acker). The Diazes both serve as maids to Delatours and the romance between Valentina and Remi is something that Zoila discourages.

Personal life
On September 24, 2015, Ganem announced via Instagram that she was pregnant.
An Instagram photo posted in February 2016 revealed that she gave birth to a son. On September 24, 2017, Ganem announced via Instagram that she was expecting her second child. An Instagram photo posted in February 2018 revealed that she gave birth to a daughter.

Filmography

Awards and nominations

References

External links
 
 

21st-century American actresses
American film actresses
American television actresses
American actresses of Mexican descent
Actresses from Modesto, California
American people of Lebanese descent
Hispanic and Latino American actresses
Living people
University of San Diego alumni
Year of birth missing (living people)